Abad Santos station is an elevated Manila Light Rail Transit (LRT) station situated on Line 1. The station serves Tondo and Santa Cruz, both in Manila, and is located on Rizal Avenue. The station is named after the nearby Abad Santos Avenue, which in turn, is named after José Abad Santos, Chief Justice of the Supreme Court of the Philippines who was executed by the Japanese invading forces during World War II.

Abad Santos station serves as the sixth station for Line 1 trains headed to Baclaran and as the fifteenth station for trains headed to Roosevelt.

Transportation links
Like its neighbor R. Papa, commuters can take the many jeepneys or taxis to Abad Santos station. Buses and UV Express that ply Rizal Avenue also stop near the station. Tricycles are available outside the station.

See also
List of rail transit stations in Metro Manila
Manila Light Rail Transit System

Manila Light Rail Transit System stations
Railway stations opened in 1985
Buildings and structures in Tondo, Manila
1985 establishments in the Philippines